Ernest Leslie Konnyu (born May 17, 1937) is an American businessman and former Republican U.S. Representative from Silicon Valley, California, 12th congressional district, serving one term from 1987 to 1989. He had previously been a California State Assembly Member from the 22nd district, serving from 1980 to 1986.

Early life
Ernõ "Ernie" Könnyű was born May 17, 1937, in Tamási, Kingdom of Hungary (present-day Tamási, Hungary) to poet, professor and cartographer Leslie Konnyu and Leslie's wife, Elizabeth, a bookkeeper and owner of a home secretarial school, and is the eldest of his two late siblings Gabriela (Helen) and Zoltan (Joseph). In 1949 the 12-year-old Konnyu, together with his family, immigrated to the United States from a post-World War II refugee camp in Ampflwang, Austria. He attended parochial and public schools in Jefferson City and St. Louis, Missouri. He attended University of Maryland, College Park and received his Bachelor of Science degree from Ohio State University in 1965. Konnyu served in the United States Air Force as a captain from 1959 to 1969 and as a major in the Air Force Reserve from 1970 to 1981. In 1959, he married Lillian Muenks of Loose Creek, Missouri.

Military service
Konnyu joined the U.S. Air Force in 1959 as an enlisted medic, served at the U.S. Air Force Hospital in Wiesbaden, Germany, with a final rank of Staff Sergeant, and attended night school at the University of Maryland's Wiesbaden campus, then got an Air Force scholarship to attend Ohio State University, where he majored in accounting. He received his BS in Business Administration in 1965. He was admitted to the Air Force Officer Training School at Lackland AFB, Texas, where he was commissioned a 2nd Lieutenant. From 1965 to 1969 he served at Nellis AFB, Nevada, as a senior auditor with a final rank of captain. He spent 11 years in the U.S. Air Force Reserve ending with a rank of major until he received an honorable discharge retiring from the Air Force in 1997.

Business career
Konnyu's business career began in 1969 as Controller at Valley View Investments in North Las Vegas, Nevada. In 1970 he moved to Arcadia, California, where he was internal audit supervisor at Avon Products, Pasadena. Konnyu, a Certified Internal Auditor, served as corporate director of internal audit at National Semiconductor Corp. in Santa Clara, California, from 1974 to 1980. Konnyu continued his community service work with the Junior Chamber of Commerce first in Arcadia, then in San Jose, California. As a result of his extensive service to the community the Arcadia Jaycees recommended Ernie Konnyu for a lifetime Senatorship in Junior Chamber International which he received in 1973.

Political career

California State Assembly
Konny was elected an Assemblyman from 1980 through 1986 representing California's 22nd Assembly District (western and southern Santa Clara County). He served as Chairman for Policy of the Assembly Republican Caucus and vice-chair of the Assembly Human Services Committee on welfare. His most notable achievement was the California workfare law, A.B. 2580, that required able bodied welfare recipients without small children to work or train in exchange for their welfare check and benefits.

Congressional career
Konnyu was elected in 1986 to the U.S. House of Representatives gaining 55% of the vote in the district previously served by Republican Congressman Ed Zschau (who tried unsuccessfully to gain a Senate seat) and Republican Congressman Pete McCloskey. Konnyu's principal legislative success was H.R. 1720, The Family Support Act of 1988 reforming the Nation's welfare system by creating, among other things, work incentives for welfare recipients.

Sexual harassment accusations
In the first year of his term, Congressman Konnyu caused waves when three separate accusations of sexual harassment were raised, and responding to it in terminology that made it even worse. In one instance, he told a staffer in a private meeting to wear "high heels and frilly" blouses, and then "asked her to stand up and turn around so he could 'see what you look like'". Another time, he commented on where a staffer chose to wear her name tag, stating that it called attention to her breasts. The staffer was then fired after refusing to attend any more private meetings with the Congressman. In addition, he alienated fellow Republicans, including higher-ranked ones. His predecessor, Republican Ed Zschau, started looking to recruit opponents to take on Konnyu in the next primary, and even Zschau's predecessor, Republican Pete McCloskey, called Konnyu an embarrassment. Konnyu lost the next Republican primary to Republican Tom Campbell, who went on to serve for two terms.

Business and retirement
Konnyu resumed his business career in 1989 investing in a printing business then in 1998 in a tax consulting service. After 22 years he sold his business and retired in 2011. He and his wife of 57 years reside in San Jose, California, and stay active with local, state and national professional, charity and political groups.

He ran unsuccessfully for Santa Clara County Assessor in 1994, losing the nonpartisan race to Democrat Larry Stone by 181,406 votes (52.51%) to 164,045 (47.49%). In 2004, he won the Republican primary for California's 24th State Assembly district but lost the general election to Democratic incumbent Rebecca Cohn by 94,152 votes (59.42%) to 55,956 (35.32%). He ran brief and abortive campaigns to challenge Democratic Lieutenant Governor Gavin Newsom in 2014, to succeed retiring Democratic U.S. Senator Barbara Boxer in 2016, against Democratic U.S. Senator Dianne Feinstein in 2018 and against Democratic Congresswoman Katie Porter in 2020.

See also 
 List of federal political sex scandals in the United States

References

External links
Calbuzz

|-

1937 births
American businesspeople
Candidates in the 2018 United States Senate elections
 
Hungarian emigrants to the United States
Living people
Republican Party members of the California State Assembly
Ohio State University alumni
People from San Jose, California
Republican Party members of the United States House of Representatives from California
United States Air Force officers
University of Maryland, College Park alumni
People from Tolna County
People from Arcadia, California
People from Saratoga, California
Military personnel from California